Babul Supriyo (born 15 December 1970) is an Indian playback singer, live performer, television host, actor and politician who currently serves as Cabinet Minister of Information Technology and Electronics and Tourism of the Government of West Bengal. He was elected Member of Parliament from Asansol in the 16th and 17th Lok Sabha and also served as the Minister of State for Environment, Forest and Climate Change, in the Union Council of Ministers. He officially resigned as MP on 19 October 2021. and was elected as a Member of the West Bengal Legislative Assembly on 16 April 2022 from Ballygunge Assembly seat.

He made a career as playback singer in Hindi cinema in the mid-nineties and has sung for many films since then. He primarily sings in Hindi, Bengali, and Odia languages. However, he has also done playback singing in 11 other languages during his musical career. He entered politics in 2014 and joined Narendra Modi's government. He previously served as Union Minister of State for Ministry of Urban Development, Ministry of Housing and Urban Poverty Alleviation and Ministry of Heavy Industries and Public Enterprises.

Supriyo quit the Bhartiya Janata Party and joined the All India Trinamool Congress Party in September 2021.

Early life
Supriyo was born and brought up in Uttarpara, a suburb town of Kolkata on the banks of the Hooghly River in West Bengal. His parents are Sunil Chandra Baral and Sumitra Baral. Babul comes from a musical family and was greatly influenced by his grandfather, Banikantha NC Baral, a Bengali vocalist and composer. He won several inter-school and inter-college music compositions, and had performed in All India Radio and Doordarshan. He attended Don Bosco School during which he became an "All India Don Bosco Music Champion" in 1983, and "The Most Enriching Talent" in 1985. He completed his bachelor's degree in commerce from Serampore College in 1991.

When he entered the entertainment industry, he changed his birth name Supriya Baral to Babul Supriyo.

Personal life
Supriyo was introduced to Riaa at a Shah Rukh Khan concert in Toronto. They married each other in 1995. His first child Sharmilee was born in 1996. Supriyo and Riaa divorced in October 2015. He remarried on 9 August 2016 to Rachna Sharma, an air hostess of Jet Airways.

Political career

An ardent admirer of Atal Bihari Vajpayee and Narendra Modi, Supriyo was introduced to Bharatiya Janata Party in March 2014. In 2014 Indian general election, he was nominated by the party as their candidate for Asansol, West Bengal and won it by defeating Dola Sen. He was inducted to Narendra Modi's government as the Union Minister of State, Ministry of Urban Development; and Ministry of Housing and Urban Poverty Alleviation on 9 November 2014. He became the youngest minister. He served in these ministries till 12 July 2016, after which his portfolio was changed to Minister of State for Heavy Industries and Public Enterprises.

In the 2019 Indian general election, Supriyo again won from the Asansol as a Bharatiya Janata Party candidate defeating Moon Moon Sen by 1.97 lakh votes, and securing a total of 6.32 lakh votes. In May 2019, he became Minister of State for Environment, Forest and Climate Change.

Member of Parliament
 
On 19 September 2019, Supriyo was attacked by students after he was invited to attend an event at Calcutta's Jadavpur University.

On 13 August 2019, Supriyo Babul, accused the state government of not giving food for the cyclone affected people in Fazarganj for 5 days.

In the 2021 West Bengal Legislative Assembly election, Babul Supriyo ran from Tollyganj (Vidhan Sabha constituency) as the Bharatiya Janata Party candidate and lost by more than 50,000 votes. Probably stung by an unexpected defeat, Supriyo stated that Bengal had made a 'historic mistake' by voting for TMC. However the Facebook post was later deleted.

On 31 July 2021, Babul Supriyo announced on social media his decision to quit politics and also resign as a Lok Sabha MP. However days later he decided to complete his tenure as MP. He then edited his Facebook post deleting the "won't join any party" remark raising speculations. On 18 September 2021 he joined All India Trinamool Congress in presence of Abhishek Banerjee.

On 16 April 2022 he was elected as a Member of the West Bengal Legislative Assembly from Ballygunge Assembly seat.

Singing career

 
After a brief work at the Standard Chartered Bank, Supriyo chose singing as a full-time career. He moved to Mumbai in 1992 to make a career in Bollywood. Kalyanji gave him a break, and took him to perform abroad at their live shows. In 1993 he toured Canada and USA with Amitabh Bachchan. He also toured US with Asha Bhonsle in 1997 and 1999. Besides playback singing, he has also done several stage shows. Babul Supriyo performed at Powai Sarvajanin Durgotsav in 2011.

His breakthrough came with "Dil Ne Dil Ko Pukara" in Kaho Naa... Pyaar Hai in 2000, the debut film of Hrithik Roshan. Some of his other popular Bollywood songs are "Pari Pari Hai Ek Pari" (Hungama), "Hum Tum" (Hum Tum) and "Chanda Chamke" (Fanaa). He is the anchor of the hit television show K for Kishore. He sang the opening themes of Balaji Telefilms serials.

Albums
Monoroma Tilottama (1997)
Hoyto Tomari Jannya (1999)
Sochta Hun (2003)
Kuch Aisa Lagta Hai
Untitled - Babul Supriyo (2008)
Kotobaaro Bhebechhinu (Rabindra Sangeet) (2009) - Asha Audio
Jodi Jantem (Rabindra Sangeet) (2010) - Asha Audio
Babul Baul (2014)
Mone Robe (2011, Rabindra Sangeet album comprising 10 songs sung by Babul Supriyo & Alka Yagnik)
Just Tomake
What The Folk
Timeless
Suna Pharua (2016, Odia)

Discography

As a playback singer

Bengali songs

Kannada songs

Odia songs 
Supriyo sang Phaguna re Phaguna in Mohammad Mohsin's movie Santana which made him a household name in Odisha. Subsequently he sang many songs in Odia.

Marathi songs

Awards and honours

 2002: Honorary citizenship by the State Council of Atlanta.
 2002: Bengal Film Journalists' Association Awards: Best Male Playback for Tak Jhal Mishti
 2003: Kalakar Awards – Best Playback Singer for Kasautii Zindagii Kay
 2004: Kalakar Awards – Best Playback Singer for Mayer Anchal
 2006: Bengal Film Journalists' Association – Best Male Playback Award for Subho Drishti.
 2007: Zee Gold Awards – Best Playback Singer for Kasautii Zindagii Kay
 2016: Walked at Grande finale show of Indian Federation for Fashion Development's India Runway Week season 6 for designer Agnimitra Paul

References

|-

External links

 
 

Living people
1970 births
People from West Bengal
Bengali Hindus
Bengali singers
Indian male singers
Bollywood playback singers
Bengali playback singers
Hindi-language singers
Odia playback singers
Don Bosco schools alumni
University of Calcutta alumni
Bengal Film Journalists' Association Award winners
Rabindra Sangeet exponents
Male actors in Bengali cinema
India MPs 2014–2019
Lok Sabha members from West Bengal
Bharatiya Janata Party politicians from West Bengal
Narendra Modi ministry
People from Asansol
India MPs 2019–present
National Democratic Alliance candidates in the 2019 Indian general election
20th-century Indian male singers
20th-century Indian singers
West Bengal MLAs 2021–2026
Singers from West Bengal